Kim Jae-Uck (born April 2, 1983) is a South Korean model and actor. He is best known for his roles in the hit series Coffee Prince (2007), comedy film Antique (2008), mystery drama Who Are You? (2013), thriller Voice (2017), The Guest (2018),  Her Private Life (2019) and Crazy Love (2022). He is fluent in Japanese, and played the role of Sō Takeyuki, the Japanese husband of Princess Deokhye, in the film The Last Princess.

Early life
Kim was born in Seoul, and grew up in Tokyo, Japan until he was seven years old before returning to South Korea. His father worked as a journalist and was transferred to Japan as a foreign correspondent. He started out performing in a band, and began modelling at age 17. Due to the time he spent in Japan, he can speak fluent Japanese.

Career

2002–2011: Career beginnings and breakthrough
In 2002, Kim debuted as the member of an indie band in the MBC drama Ruler of Your Own World. After this first role, he concentrated on his modeling career for 5 years. In 2007, he auditioned for and won the role of No Sun-ki in the 2007 hit drama series Coffee Prince. The role shot him to fame in both South Korea and several Asian countries. He later appeared in the 2008 drama The Kingdom of The Winds, and served as the ambassador of goodwill for the 9th Jeonju International Film Festival (JIFF) in May 2008.

Kim then starred in his first film, Antique, based on the manga Antique Bakery, which was invited to the 59th Berlin International Film Festival. He played a gay chef working at a bakery. He won the Best New Actor award at the 16th Korean Entertainment Awards. In October 2009, he formed a modern rock band named Walrus, where he served as guitarist and vocal. The name of the group came from the Beatles single "I am the Walrus". 
 
Kim got his first leading role in Bee TV's South Korean-Japanese drama Give Me Your Memory: Pygmalion's Love, which aired in March 2010. The same year, he starred in the melodrama television series Bad Guy, and featured in the romantic comedy series Marry Me, Mary!.

Before enlisting to military service in 2011, he played in rock musical, Hedwig And the Angry Inch, from May 14 until June 19, 2011.

2013–2016: Comeback
After finishing his mandatory military service, Kim made his comeback in the 2013 television series Who Are You?, playing the dead boyfriend of So Yi-hyun's character. In 2014, Kim was featured in KBS' period action drama Inspiring Generation as Kim Hyun-joong's rival, but quit after episode 8 due to unavoidable circumstances.

In 2015, Kim was cast for the lead role in the fantasy comedy film Plank Constant, playing a script writer with weird sexual fantasies.

The following year, Kim took on the role of a Japanese nobleman who marries Son Ye-jin's character Princess Deokhye in the period film The Last Princess. The same year, Kim took a leading role in the film Two Rooms, Two Nights as a popular movie director who tries to maintain secretive romantic relationships with both: his current girl friend and ex-girl friend.

2017–present: Rising popularity
In January 2017, Kim starred in romance film Another way (2017), playing the role of a police officer who finds Seo Yea-ji's character online and forms a suicide pact. He then played the antagonist in OCN's hit thriller drama Voice, earning acclaim for his performance as a serial killer. In July the same year, Kim was cast as in the romance drama Temperature of Love, playing a rich businessman.

In 2018, Kim was cast in the musical Amadeus in triple casting, alongside Jo Jung-suk and Kim Sung-kyu. Kim's Japanese film Butterfly Sleep was released in Japan in May 2018. The same year, he was cast in OCN's supernatural thriller The Guest.

In 2019, Kim was cast as the main lead in the romantic comedy drama Her Private Life alongside Park Min-young. The show marks Kim's first time as a primary lead in a romantic comedy.

In 2020, Kim created "My Margiela", a 5-episode video series on the Belgian fashion designer Martin Margiela.

In 2022, Kim stars alongside Krystal Jung in KBS2 television series Crazy Love, playing a maths instructor and CEO of a top math institute.

Personal life
In May 2011, along with fashion models Jang Yoon-ju, Ji Hyun-jung, Han Hye-jin and Song Kyung-ah, he co-authored Top Model, a book based on their experiences in the industry. He then enlisted for mandatory military service on July 5, 2011 for 21 months of active duty after five weeks of basic military training. In June 2015, Kim signed an exclusive contract with management agency Better ENT. In June 2017, he left Better ENT and signed with new management agency Management SOOP.

Filmography

Film

Television

Theater

Awards

References

External links

 Kim Jae Wook on HanCinema
  

Living people
1983 births
South Korean male models
South Korean male television actors
South Korean male film actors